Ryan Batchelor is an Australian politician. He is a member of the Victorian Legislative Council representing the Southern Metropolitan Region since November 2022. Batchelor is a member of the Labor Party.

References 

Living people
Members of the Victorian Legislative Council
Australian Labor Party members of the Parliament of Victoria
21st-century Australian politicians
Year of birth missing (living people)